Philippe Guyot-Sionnest (born 1961, Nancy, France) is a professor at the University of Chicago appointed jointly in the departments of physics and chemistry. He works in the field of colloidal semiconductors and metal nanocrystals.

He gained a Diplome d'Etude Approfondie in Orsay, France, in 1984 and a PhD at the University of California, Berkeley in 1987.
He worked as a Research Scientist at the University of Paris-Sud in Orsay, France from 1988 to 1991, moving to the US in 1991 as Professor in both the Department of Chemistry and the Department of Physics at the University of Chicago, a position he has held since.

His research interest is in the behaviour of nanocrystals of semiconductor materials.

Awards
 2001 Fellow of the American Physical Society
 1992 David and Lucile Packard Foundation Fellow.
 1990 Prix National des Lasers, Société Française de Physique

Selected publications

References

1961 births
Living people
Scientists from Nancy, France
University of California, Berkeley alumni
University of Chicago faculty
Fellows of the American Physical Society
French emigrants to the United States